Kohistanat District is a district of Sar-e Pol Province, Afghanistan.

War in Afghanistan
In June, 2019, Afghan security forces launched clearance operations to remove insurgents from the district, killing 16 militants.

Villages
Aruj, Afghanistan
Gawanak
Jarghan
Jawak
Negala

References

Districts of Sar-e Pol Province